"Kali" is a popular award-winning poem by the eminent Indian writer, linguist and literary critic Rukmini Bhaya Nair. The poem won First Prize in the Second All India Poetry Competition conducted by The Poetry Society (India) in 1990. The poem has been widely cited and anthologised in reputed journals and scholarly volumes on contemporary Indian poetry.

Excerpts from the poem

A goddess chews on myth
As other women might on paan
Red juices stain her mouth.

Bored by her own powers
Immense and spectral, Kali broods
About Shiva, she is perverse.

She will not plead with him
Nor reveal Ganesha’s birth
She will not ask him home.

Shiva loves her, but absences
And apsaras are natural to him
No god is hampered by his sins.

 *****

Loneliness drives this goddess mad
She is vagrant, her limbs askew
She begs a mate, her hair unmade.

Fickle as Shiva, memory deserts her
Chandi or Durga or Parvati, which
Is she, which of her selves weeps here?

Even Ganesha, for whom she feels
Only tenderness, excludes her, even he
Seems impatient with her flaws.

  *****

Both gift Kali a companion eagle, hurt
By no arrow, fed on nothing, it returns
Each night to its eyrie in her heart.

Comments and criticism
The poem has received rave reviews since its first publication in 1990 in the anthology on Indian Poetry Emerging Voices. The poem has been frequently quoted in scholarly analysis of contemporary Indian English Poetry. The poem is regarded by critics as a jewel in contemporary Indian poetry.

Although outwardly the poem describes the Hindu Goddess Kali, her tantrums and her equation with her son Ganesha and consort Shiva, the poem has a clear existentialist message for the Indian woman and her many socio-psychological trappings. In her writings, Rukmini brings about this interplay between the esoteric and the mundane in systematic subjugation of Indian woman over the centuries. The poem has been widely discussed at various literary festivals.

Online references
  Third National Poetry Competition 1990 - Award Winners
  Rukmini Bhaya Nair - A Biography
  India Writes - Contemporary Indian Poetry

See also
  The Full Poem - Kali
Indian English Poetry
The Poetry Society (India)
"Best Indian Poems"

Notes

Indian poems
1990 poems
Works originally published in Indian magazines
Works originally published in literary magazines